Owen Dippie is a New Zealand street artist. He has mural works on exterior building walls in Auckland, Brooklyn, and Los Angeles. He is also involved with mental-health and suicide awareness outreach, and breast cancer research fundraising.

Gallery

References

External links 
 

Graffiti artists
Year of birth missing (living people)
Living people
21st-century New Zealand artists
21st-century New Zealand male artists